Adirondack Lynx is an American women’s soccer team, founded in 2005. The team is a member of the Women's Premier Soccer League, the third tier of women’s soccer in the United States and Canada. The team plays in the North Division of the East Conference.

The team plays its home games in the stadium on the campus of Skidmore College in Saratoga Springs, New York. The club's colors are gold, green, white and black.

Year-by-year

Honors
 WPSL East North Division Champions 2006

Coaches
  PJ Motsiff 2006–present

Stadia
 Stadium at Skidmore College, Saratoga Springs, New York -present

References

External links
 Official Site
 WPSL Adirondack Lynx page
 https://www.saratogian.com/2007/06/06/getting-their-kicks/

Women's soccer clubs in New York (state)
Women's Premier Soccer League teams
2005 establishments in New York (state)